Ciara Watling née Sherwood (born 18 August 1992) is a Northern Irish footballer who plays as a midfielder for Southampton in the FA Women's Championship.

Club career 
Watling joined Charlton Athletic at the age of 15 after a successful trial following recommendation from Keith Boanas, where she was awarded Player of the Season for the academy in her first season.

After a season with Charlton's first team, Watling went on loan to Millwall Lionesses before moving permanently. During the 2013–14 season, Watling captained the Millwall Lionesses Development Squad. Watling made her debut for the first team as a substitute against London Bees in the FA WSL Cup in May 2014. She made her first start two months later against Watford.

During the 2016 FA WSL mid-season transfer window, Watling left Millwall Lionesses by mutual agreement before signing for Crystal Palace for the 2016–17 season. Watling moved back to Charlton on January 15, 2020.

After her first full season with Charlton, Watling signed for Southampton in the FA Women's National League that summer. Following their successful promotion push in the 2021-22 season, she will play the 2022-23 season in the FA Women's Championship.

International career 
Watling made her debut for the Northern Ireland national team on 24 October 2015 against Georgia.

Personal life
Watling is married to Harry Watling, assistant manager of Glasgow Rangers. She is a cousin of EastEnders actress Jacqueline Jossa.

References

External links
FAWNL stats
Charlton Athletic bio

1992 births
Living people
FA Women's National League players
Women's Super League players
Charlton Athletic W.F.C. players
Millwall Lionesses L.F.C. players
Northern Ireland women's international footballers
Women's association football midfielders
Women's association footballers from Northern Ireland
Crystal Palace F.C. (Women) players
Southampton F.C. Women players